Fred or Frederick Ahern may refer to:
Fred Ahern (ice hockey) (born 1952), American ice hockey player
 Frederick Ahern (1907–1982), American filmmaker
 Fred Ahern (equestrian) (1900–1958), Irish equestrian 
 Fred M. Ahern (1884–1950), New York politician